CUMYL-THPINACA (also known as SGT-42) is an indazole-3-carboxamide based synthetic cannabinoid. CUMYL-THPINACA acts as a potent agonist for the cannabinoid receptors, with approximately 6x selectivity for CB1, having an EC50 of 0.1nM for human CB1 receptors and 0.59nM for human CB2 receptors.

Legal status 

Sweden's public health agency suggested to classify CUMYL-THPINACA as hazardous substance on November 10, 2014.

As of October 2015 CUMYL-THPINACA is a controlled substance in China.

See also
 5F-CUMYL-PINACA
 5F-SDB-006
 ADAMANTYL-THPINACA
 CUMYL-4CN-BINACA
 CUMYL-CBMINACA
 CUMYL-PICA
 CUMYL-PINACA
 SDB-006
 NNE1

References

Cannabinoids
Designer drugs
Indazolecarboxamides